Kariuki is a kikuyu male name. Notable people with the surname include:

Gina Din Kariuki (born 1961), Kenyan businesswoman
Godffrey Gitahi Kariuki, Kenyan politician
Jemimah Kariuki, Kenyan doctor
John Ngata Kariuki, Kenyan politician and businessman
Josiah Mwangi Kariuki (1929–1975), Kenyan socialist politician during the administration of the Jomo Kenyatta government
Julius Kariuki (born 1961), Kenyan athlete
Kellen Kariuki, Kenyan accountant and businesswoman
Muthui Kariuki (born 1956), Kenyan journalists
Patrick Kariuki Muiruri (born 1945), Kenyan politician

References